Niccolini is a surname. Notable people with the surname include:

Antonio Niccolini (abbot) (1701–1769), Italian abbot, jurist and scholar
Antonio Niccolini (architect) (1772–1850), Italian architect and engraver
Dianora Niccolini (born 1936), Italian fine art photographer
Francesco Niccolini (1639–1692), Italian archbishop and diplomat
Giovanni Battista Niccolini (1782–1861), Italian poet and playwright 
Ippolito Niccolini (1848–1919), Italian businessman and politician
Julian Niccolini, American restaurateur